Malkerns is a town in Eswatini, located in the Manzini District. As of 2019, it has a population of 8,074.

References

Populated places in Manzini Region